Springfield is a rural locality in the Shire of Mareeba, Queensland, Australia.

Geography
The Lynd River forms part of the south-eastern boundary before flowing through from south-east to north-west.

References 

Shire of Mareeba
Localities in Queensland